Shillingford Bridge  is Grade II* listed road bridge near Shillingford,  Oxfordshire,  carrying an unclassified road (formerly the A329 road)  across the River Thames  in England on the reach above Benson Lock. The bridge provides access between  Shillingford to the north of the river and Wallingford  to the south. Originally the south side was in Berkshire but was transferred from Berkshire to Oxfordshire in 1974. The bridge is single track and vehicular passage is  controlled by traffic lights.

There  are records which suggest the presence of a bridge on the site in the  14th century but this structure was short-lived and crossing was made by ferry  from at least 1379 until a timber bridge was built in 1767. The present  stone structure dates from 1827. A toll was payable on both the ferry and the subsequent bridges until 1874 when the County Councils  of Berkshire and Oxfordshire joined to buy the bridge from its private trustees and scrapped the charges.

Background

In the Patent Rolls  of 1301 the Earl of Cornwall  is recorded as leasing a fishery "downstream of Shillingford Bridge"  and in 1370 a bridge at Shillingford is mentioned again as a boundary  of another fishery. This however  is the last mention of a bridged crossing on the site until 1763. It is  unusual for a bridge to completely disappear but the probable  explanation is that the Governor of Wallingford Castle had a small  wooden bridge built to give pedestrians and horsemen easy passage to Dorchester Abbey  but later had it removed due to security concerns for the Royal Castle.  There is no doubt that a bridge did exist as Gough's  Camden  (1789) records that piles and beams were dredged up at the site of  Shillingford Ferry.

The  medieval bridge had almost certainly been dismantled by 1379 when  Shillingford Ferry was granted for life to Roger Hurst, Porter of  Wallingford Castle.  The ferry remained as a perquisite  of the Castle's porters until 1530 when it was leased to Roger Hacheman  for 33s 4d per annum. Hacheman also leased a small dwelling on what was  then the Berkshire (south) bank in 1545, the dwelling, rebuilt and  expanded several times, was known as the Swan Inn by 1608 and is now the  Shillingford Bridge Hotel. Thomas Baskerville's travel journal of 1692 reports "At Shillingford a great barge to waft over carts, coaches, horse and man".

1767 bridge

In 1749 William  Blackstone became Recorder of Wallingford. He was a lawyer and  frequently used the ferry to travel between Wallingford and Oxford but  in times of flood and strong stream he was forced to take a longer route  via Wallingford Bridge. Blackstone decided that a bridge was necessary  and in November 1763 under his leadership the local gentry petitioned  parliament  which led to an Act of Parliament in December 1763 "for repairing  and widening the Road from Shillingford in the County of Oxford, through  Wallingford and Pangbourne  to Reading in the County of Berks and for  building of a Bridge over the River Thames at or near Shillingford  Ferry".  The Act described the ferry as "dangerous for persons to pass in times  of flood". The Shillingford  to Reading Turnpike Trust was created in 1764 with powers to improve  and maintain the existing road and to take responsibility for building  the new bridge. Over 100 Berkshire  and Oxfordshire landowners were trustees including Viscount Fane,  Lord Charles Spence and the Honourable Peregrine Berie who were all  named in the Act of Parliament.

Work on the bridge did not begin until 1766 when stone foundations, piers and abutments were built supporting a wooden trestle road bed. Completion of the bridge was  announced in the Reading  Mercury in April 1767. Jackson's Oxford  Journal gives the precise opening date as 25 April 1767 and records that the bridge was "fenced with a neat Chinese Railing". The Turnpike Trust took a loan of £7,700 (equivalent to £ today) which covered both the cost of purchasing the ferry rights and the construction of the bridge. As well as a toll-gate on the bridge, the Trust also collected tolls at gates situated at Winterbrook and Pangbourne Lane; however, the bridge yielded the highest income of  all even though the bridge tolls were lower.

Present structure

By 1826 the old bridge was in poor repair and the Trustees placed an advertisement announcing the wooden structure would be closed starting 10 May 1826 and a ferry  provided whilst a new stone bridge was being built.  The Act of Parliament renewing the Trustees' powers received Royal Assent on 2 April 1827 and described the old bridge as "ruinous" and "in part taken  down" and the new one "nearly completed". The Act also  contains one of the earliest mentions of the convention of driving on  the left in the United Kingdom  laying down a fine of 20-40 shillings (equivalent to £  to £  today) for "any person who shall not keep his carriage on the left hand side of the road".

A few months later on 18 June 1827 the Reading Mercury noted that "the Substantial Stone Bridge over the River Thames at Shillingford has for a long time been sufficiently complete for the  passage of travellers and their carriages and it will very shortly be finished in all its ornamental parts". On the Oxfordshire (north) bank was a small tow-path arch and a  causeway. The toll-keeper's cottage was located on the downstream side of the Oxfordshire bank.

In 1852 the Trustees' powers were renewed by Act of Parliament which also allowed for additional tolls for vehicles "drawn by steam or machinery".  Twenty years later, in 1872, a law was passed allowing the trustees and owners of turnpikes and toll-bridges to surrender their rights to the local highway authority. Bridge traffic had been declining since the opening of the Reading to Oxford Railway in 1844 so the Trustees immediately made arrangements to pass the bridge to the counties of Berkshire and Oxfordshire. From midnight on 1 November 1874 tolls were permanently lifted.

Other than the demolition of the toll-keeper's cottage in 1937 the external appearance of the bridge and environs remains as when it was built in 1827.  The bridge has been listed Grade II* since 9 April 1952.

See also
Crossings of the River Thames

References
References

Bibliography

External links
 Where Thames Smooth Waters Glide: Images of  Shillingford Bridge

Bridges across the River Thames
Bridges in Oxfordshire
History of Berkshire
Bridges completed in 1827
Bridges completed in 1767
Former toll bridges in England
1767 establishments in England
Grade II* listed buildings in Oxfordshire
Grade II* listed bridges in England